dios is an album by dios Malos released by Startime International in 2004.  This album was chosen as one of Amazon.com's Top 100 Editor's Picks of 2005 (#84).

Track listing

"Nobody's Perfect" – 5:27
"Starting Five" – 3:17
"The Uncertainty of How Things Are" – 4:29
"Fifty Cents" – 4:17
"All Said & Done" – 5:27
"You'll Get Yours" – 3:08
"Birds" – 2:56
"You Make Me Feel Uncomfortable" – 3:59
"Just Another Girl" – 3:10
"You Got Me All Wrong" – 3:13
"Meeting People" – 5:37
"All My Life" – 4:45

References

2004 albums
Startime International albums